Wayra Willk'i (Aymara wayra wind, willk'i gap, "wind gap", also spelled Huayra Willkhi) is a mountain in the Bolivian Andes which reaches a height of approximately . It is located in the La Paz Department, Loayza Province, Cairoma Municipality, northwest of Cairoma. Wayra Willk'i lies north of Pukara Ch'utu and southeast of Wanuni.

References 

Mountains of La Paz Department (Bolivia)